Akraba (variants: Aqrab, Aqraba, Agrab or Aqrabiyah) may refer to:

 Aqraba, Nablus, a Palestinian town in the Nablus Governorate
 Aqrab, a Syrian town in the Hama Governorate
 Aqraba, Syria, a Syrian town in the Daraa Governorate
 Aqraba, Rif Dimashq Governorate, a Syrian town in the Ghouta region of Rif Dimashq
 Aqrabiyah, a Syrian town in the Homs Governorate near Lebanon
 Aaqbe, a Lebanese village and municipality in the Beqaa Governorate
 Tell Agrab, an ancient settlement in Iraq in Diyala Governorate
 Al-Aqrab Prison, a prison in Cairo, Egypt

See also
 Aqraba (disambiguation)